Eric Allen Wunderlich (born May 22, 1970) is an American former competition swimmer and breaststroke specialist who represented the United States at the 1996 Summer Olympics in Atlanta, Georgia.  He won two gold medals at the FINA World Aquatics Championships in the men's 4×100-meter medley relay event (1991 and 1994).

See also
 List of World Aquatics Championships medalists in swimming (men)

References
 

1970 births
Living people
American male breaststroke swimmers
Medalists at the FINA World Swimming Championships (25 m)
Michigan Wolverines men's swimmers
Olympic swimmers of the United States
Swimmers at the 1996 Summer Olympics
World Aquatics Championships medalists in swimming